In enzymology, an alpha,alpha-trehalase is an enzyme with system name alpha,alpha-trehalose glucohydrolase. This enzyme  catalyzes the chemical reaction

alpha,alpha-trehalose + H2O  2 D-glucose

Thus, the two substrates of this enzyme are alpha,alpha-trehalose and H2O, whereas its product is D-glucose.

This enzyme belongs to the family of hydrolases, specifically those glycosidases that hydrolyse O- and S-glycosyl compounds.  The systematic name of this enzyme class is alpha,alpha-trehalose glucohydrolase. This enzyme is also called trehalase.  This enzyme participates in starch and sucrose metabolism.

Structural studies

References 

EC 3.2.1
Enzymes of known structure